The Sint-Maartenscollege (abbreviated as, and informally SMC) is a state secondary school in Maastricht, the Netherlands. It operates two buildings and offers all streams of the Dutch secondary education system including the VMBO, HAVO and VWO (Atheneum and Gymnasium).

Name 
The school is named after Saint Martin of Tours (Dutch: Sint-Maarten) who stands for helping and sharing. This is also the motto of the school.

Buildings 
Two buildings are used by the SMC. One is located on the Bemelerweg in the Scharn neighbourhood and is used for classes of the VMBO education stream. Another building, located on the Noormannensingel in the Wyck neighbourhood, is used for classes of the HAVO and VWO educational streams. A third building was once in use but has since been sold.

Classes 
A school day starts at 08.30 and usually ends between 14.20 and 16.15. The following classes are taught (although implementation depends on the stream of education taken):

 English
 Dutch
 German
 French
 Spanish
 Latin (only taught to VWO-Gymnasium)
 Greek (only taught to VWO-Gymnasium)
 Economics
 History
 Geography
 Maths
 Biology
 Chemistry
 Physics
 ICT
 Drawing
 Handicraft
 Life sciences
 NLT (Dutch Wikipedia)
 Music
 ANW (Dutch Wikipedia)
 Philosophy
 Pre-Socratic Philosophy (If chosen by Gymnasium in 5th class)
 Rhetoric (If chosen by Gymnasium in 5th class)
 Drama/Theatre

MacBooks 
The school has a room called the "Macademie", where a couple of MacOS computers are situated. This lies within the area of the art classes.

Extracurricular activities 
SMC has many extracurricular activities such as the school paper and a debate club:

School paper
The school paper, Palet, has won the title of "Best school paper of the Netherlands" in 2002 en 2003. Additionally, it won "Best school paper design" in 2001 and 2006 at the Dutch National School Paper Day. In 2009 the paper's editors were present at this event. Yvonne Doornduyn, political journalist and jury member, said: "'Palet' has a good combination between a strong layout and good contents". Palet counts about 20 editing members, of which 3 are of the school staff. The editors meet at least once every week to discuss layout, design, contents and so forth. The paper is issued 3 to 5 times a year and contains issues e.g. discrimination, politics and news, but also less serious topics such as new trends, info about schools and going out.

SMC Videoclub
SMC also has their own AV Club. It has 10 members of which 1 is of the school staff. They make their own scripts and film these in a professional manner using professional equipment. They also have their own website. However, due to COVID-19, this has been cancelled.

Cooking club
Every Monday afternoon a number of students gather to cook and eat together. One member of the staff takes care of this club. However, due to COVID-19, this has been cancelled.

Debate club
Students are given the opportunity to develop their debating skills in Dutch class. The debate club is mainly for the higher classes though (class 4 and up). These can enter in (national) debating competitions. There have been several students each year who compete in national debating competitions and some have even won prizes. The debate club is currently (2012) managed by pupils.

Notable alumni
 Camiel Eurlings, politician and Dutch Minister of Transport, Public Works and Water Management
 Maxime Verhagen, politician and current Dutch Minister of Foreign Affairs
 Boudewijn Zenden, Dutch soccer player

External links
 http://www.sint-maartenscollege.nl - Official website
 http://www.smc-vc.nl - SMC Videoclub (AV Club) website

 
Christian schools in the Netherlands
Secondary schools in Maastricht